Tom Herman is an American football coach. He is currently the offensive line coach at Mercyhurst University in Erie, Pennsylvania.  From 1989 to 1998, he was the head football coach at Gannon University in Erie, Pennsylvania, where he compiled a record of 43–51–2.

Head coaching record

References

External links
 Mercyhurst profile

Year of birth missing (living people)
Living people
American football defensive linemen
American football offensive linemen
Edinboro Fighting Scots football coaches
Edinboro Fighting Scots football players
Gannon Golden Knights football coaches
Marshall Thundering Herd football coaches
Mercyhurst Lakers football coaches
New Hampshire Wildcats football coaches
High school football coaches in Pennsylvania
People from Ellwood City, Pennsylvania
Players of American football from Pennsylvania